A Dutch creole is a creole language that has been substantially influenced by the Dutch language. 

Most Dutch-based creoles originated in Dutch colonies in the Americas and Southeast Asia, after the 17th century expansion of Dutch maritime power. Almost all of them are now extinct, while two known varieties are classified as "critically endangered". The extinction has generally been attributed to a wilful cultural and generational language shift towards standard Dutch or the majority language of the area with each successive generation.

Afrikaans is considered to be a daughter language of Dutch and it, by contrast, is vibrant and has completely displaced Dutch in southern Africa. Though not a majority-held position, it is considered by some linguists to be a creole because of its simpler grammar relative to Dutch.

List 
Some important Dutch creoles are the following:

Dutch has also made a significant contribution to other creoles:

Papiamento
 based mostly on Portuguese and Spanish, spoken in Aruba, Bonaire and Curaçao.
Saramaccan
 based mostly on English, Portuguese and African languages, spoken in Suriname
Sranan Tongo
 based mostly on English, spoken in Suriname
Manado Malay
 based on Malay with a significant number of Dutch vocabulary, spoken in the city of Manado, Indonesia

Despite its name, Pennsylvania Dutch is not descended from Dutch, but is a variety of West Central German.

See also 
 Differences between Afrikaans and Dutch